Thesis on a Homicide is a 2013 Argentine-Spanish thriller and mystery film directed by  and written by  which stars Ricardo Darín, Alberto Ammann, Arturo Puig and Calu Rivero.

Plot 
The plot revolves around Roberto Bermúdez, a specialist in Criminal Law who is convinced that Gonzalo, one of his students, is the author of a brutal murder, initiating an investigation that obsesses him.

Cast

Production 
An Argentine-Spanish co-production, Thesis on a Homicide was produced by Tornasol Films, BD Cine, Castafiore Films, and Haddock.

Release 
The film premiered on 17 January 2013. It was a critical and commercial success, having led the Argentine box office for three consecutive weeks and having reached almost 640,000 spectators (a very good number for Argentina's film revenue standards). It was theatrically released in Spain on 5 April 2013.

Accolades 

|-
| rowspan = "10" align = "center" | 2013 || rowspan = "10" | 8th Sur Awards || colspan = "2" | Best Film ||  || rowspan = "10" | 
|-
| Best Director || Hernán Goldfrid || 
|-
| Best Actor || Ricardo Darín || 
|-
| Best Adapted Screenplay || Patricio Vega || 
|-
| Best New Actress || Calu Rivero || 
|-
| Best Cinematography || Rodrigo Pulpeiro || 
|-
| Best Costume Design || Julio Suárez || 
|-
| Best Sound || Juan Ferro || 
|-
| Best Original Score || Sergio Moure de Oteyza || 
|-
| Best Editing || Pablo Barbieri || 
|-
| rowspan = "10" align = "center" | 2014 || rowspan = "10" | 62nd Silver Condor Awards || colspan = "2" | Best Film ||  || rowspan = "10" | 
|-
| Best Director ||  Hernán Goldfrid || 
|-
| Best Actor || Ricardo Darín || 
|-
| Best New Actress || Calu Rivero || 
|-
| Best Adapted Screenplay || Patricio Vega || 
|-
| Best Cinematography || Rodrigo Pulpeiro || 
|-
| Best Editing || Pablo Barbieri || 
|-
| Best Art Direction || Mariela Rípodas || 
|-
| Best Sound || Diego Garrido, Jesica Suárez, Juan Ferro || 
|-
| Best Costume Design || Julio Suárez || 
|}

See also 
 List of Argentine films of 2013
 List of Spanish films of 2013

References

External links
 
 Details of Tesis Sobre Un Homicidio Bluray release

2010s mystery films
2013 crime thriller films
2013 films
Argentine crime thriller films
Argentine mystery films
Spanish crime thriller films
Spanish mystery films
2010s Spanish-language films
Films based on Argentine novels
Films based on crime novels
Films shot in Buenos Aires
Films set in Buenos Aires
2010s Argentine films
2010s Spanish films
Tornasol Films films